Seaton Delaval is a village in Northumberland, England, with a population of 4,371.  The largest of the five villages in Seaton Valley, it is the site of Seaton Delaval Hall, completed by Sir John Vanbrugh in 1727.

In 2010 the armed robbery of Jimmy's Fish Bar featured in news coverage of Raoul Moat's crime rampage.

History
The name 'Seaton Delaval' was first attested as 'Seton de la Val' in 1270. 'Seaton' simply means 'sea town', referring to the village's nearness to the North Sea. The land was held by the Delaval family, who took their name from Laval in Maine in France. Their descendants are still major landholders in the area today and the current Lord Hastings is Delaval Astley, 23rd Baron Hastings.

The folk song ‘Blackleg Miner’ mentions the village:
Oh, Delaval is a terrible place
They rub wet clay in the blackleg's face.
And around the heaps they run a foot race,
To catch the blackleg miner!

So divint gan near the Seghill mine.
Across the way they stretch a line,
To catch the throat and break the spine
Of the dirty blackleg miner!

Governance
From 1974 the village was part of the Blyth Valley borough, but as part of the 2009 structural changes to local government in England responsibility was transferred to Northumberland County Council. The village is in the NE25 post code area and the coastal town of Whitley Bay, Tyne and Wear. Unlike other parts of Northumberland, Seaton Delaval and the surrounding villages use the Tyne and Wear 0191 area code.

Geography
The village is centred on the intersection of two main roads: the A192 road running from North Shields to Morpeth and the A190 road running from the Dudley village bypass to Seaton Sluice. These main roads are lined by terraced housing from the turn of the 20th century but large post-war and 1970s house development is predominant. There are small pockets of more recent housing and a new estate of houses was completed in 2012.

Nearby villages include:
Holywell
Seghill
Seaton Sluice
New Hartley

Economy
The village has its own independent cooperative, the Seaton Valley Co-Operative Society, which runs a small supermarket, post office and off-licence. There are also several convenience stores and public houses, such as The Keel Row pub/restaurant on Foreman's Row, Hastings Arms on Wheatridge Row and the Victoria and Albert Inn on Seaton Terrace. The other, mainly independent, stores include a regionally renowned ice cream parlour (Arrighi's, often incorrectly pronounced "Riggy's"), a pine furnishing store, a florist and a garage.

The Victoria and Albert Inn was formally 2 separate inns With the Victoria dating back to 1839, the 2 were merged to form The Victoria and Albert Inn. In 2012 local residents put up a brave fight and took on Tesco and prevented them from changing their pub to a Tesco Express store. In 2019/2020 the Victoria and Albert underwent a major refurbishment.

The Seaton Terrace is now the premier social club in the Village after the demise of the "Top Club". The club has over 850 members and has recently because solvent again, paying off over £250,000 worth of debt and was due to celebrate its "Independence Day" on July 4 after getting its deeds back.
The club has been known for its nightlife over the years and has hosted some top local acts like the Sleaze Sisters, Digits, Queen's of Noise, Jason Isaacs and the Fontains as well as world-renowned Bay City Roller, Eric Faulkner.

Coty has a factory in the village following a merger of between Procter and Gamble and Coty for the acquisition of their beauty business, once the independent Shultons factory. Shultons formerly manufactured Old Spice aftershave before Procter & Gamble's acquisition of the brand. The factory is now employed in the manufacture of Clairol hair dye products, including Nice 'n Easy, as well as the Hugo Boss fragrance range along with a number of other products.

Landmarks

Transport
A railway line, now used only for freight, runs to the North of the village. A railway station was opened in 1841 but was closed to passengers in 1964. There are bus links to nearby Whitley Bay, Cramlington and Blyth as well as to Newcastle-upon-Tyne.

Education
The village is served by five main schools:
Seaton Delaval Parent/Toddler Group
Seaton Delaval Pre-school (ages 2 – school)
Seaton Terrace Nursery (closed/demolished) 
Seaton Delaval Community First School (previously "The Station School" before being moved to the same site as Whytrig Middle as part of Northumberland County Council's switch from three to two-tier education)
Holywell Village First School
Whytrig County Middle School (moved on to the site of Astley High School as of September 2014)
Astley Community High School (including Sixth Form and Adult Education)

Religious sites
There are a number of Christian churches in the village:
The Church of Our Lady (Church of England)
Elsdon Avenue United Reformed and Methodist Church
Holy Trinity, Seghill (Church of England)

Culture
The Seaton Delaval Arts Centre, a small auditorium hosting musical and drama entertainment, often locally produced, is housed in the former Salvation Army Hall in the centre of the village.

Notable residents
 Ralph Delaval – Admiral
 George Delaval – Admiral and builder of Seaton Delaval Hall
 Noel Forster – Artist and teacher
 John Gardner – Thriller writer, continued James Bond books
 Ivor Gurney – Poet and composer
 Ray Kennedy – Arsenal and Liverpool footballer
 Laura Pidcock - Former Labour MP for North West Durham
 England football internationals Clem Stephenson and his brother George were both born in Seaton Delaval
 Billy Wilson professional footballer Blackburn Rovers and Portsmouth F.C.
 Gordon Parker - Novelist, Playwright and Literary Critic

References

External links
Arts centre – A building saved by the Community for the Community and now a modern Community Arts Venue
A Seaton Delaval Website
A Seaton Delaval History Website
Residents Association Official Website
Astley High School
The Keel Row, Pub & Dining, Website
Northumberland Communities (Accessed: 27 November 2008)

Villages in Northumberland